Pitaah (Father) is a 2002 Indian Bollywood Action Drama film directed by Mahesh Manjrekar and produced by Avinash Adik. It stars Sanjay Dutt, Jackie Shroff, Nandita Das and Om Puri in pivotal roles. The plot of the film similar to the 1996 film A Time to Kill. The film was well received by critics as well as audience.

Plot
A small town in rural India gets to witness a confrontation between two fathers, one a rich, powerful, and cruel Zamindar Thakur Avadh Narayan Singh who wants the man who filed a police complaint against his two sons to be killed immediately. The other is Rudra, a poor laborer employed by Avadh, who wants justice when he finds out that his nine-year-old daughter, Durga, has been beaten and brutally raped by Avadh's sons, Bachhu, and Bhola.

His quest for justice is made harder due to a corrupt doctor, willing to change his medical report after he is bribed appropriately; and Police Inspector, Ramnarayan Bhardwaj, who is willing to drop any charges against Avadh's sons provided he gets his "dues" from the Thakur. These hardships force Rudra to take matters into his own hands and he kills the Thakur's sons when they arrive for there court date.

Rudra confronts the Thakur and apologises for his actions, he agrees to surrender himself to the police in return for his families safety. However, Avadh refuses to give in and Rudra kills his men. The Thakur himself is eventually killed by Rudra's wife Paro. Rudra then surrenders himself to the police and is given a six-month sentence. He is eventually released and reunites with his family, finally at peace.

Cast
 Sanjay Dutt as Rudra
 Jackie Shroff as Ramnarayan Bharadwaj, police officer (daroga)
 Nandita Das as Paro
 Om Puri as Thakur Avadh Narayan Singh
 Mita Vasisht as Thakurain
 Anupama Verma as Thakur's daughter
 Siddharth Ray as Bacchu, Thakur's eldest son
 Vineet Kumar Singh as Bhola, Thakur's youngest son
 Sachin Khedekar as Shiva
 Salil Ankola as Krishna, Shiva's Son and Thakur Daughter Love Interest
 Atul Kale as Villager
 Anjan Srivastav as Senior Doctor
 Ankush Chaudhari as Junior Doctor
 Shivaji Satam as Railway Station Master
 Mink Singh as Naina
 Tanvi Hegde as Durga, 'Muniya' (Rudra's daughter)
 Sagar Thawani as Lav, Durga's brother
 Samrat Thawani  as Kush, Durga's brother
 Kalpana Pandit as Special Appearance (Song 'Meri Jawani')
 Nilesh Diwekar as Bheema

Soundtrack

References

External links

2000s Hindi-language films
2002 films
Indian action drama films
Indian rape and revenge films
Films directed by Mahesh Manjrekar
Indian films about revenge
Films about rape in India
2002 action drama films